The Federal Parliament of Somalia (often Baarlamaanka Federaalka Soomaaliya) is the national parliament of Somalia. Formed in August 2012, it is based in the capital Mogadishu and is bicameral, consisting of an Upper House (Senate) and a Lower House (House of the People).

Parliamentary history
The first parliament in independent Somalia was unicameral National Assembly (1960–1969). It was followed by unicameral House of the People (1969–2012) which did not function during Somali Civil War. Unicameral Federal Parliament was established in 2012, and it was reformulated as bicameral in 2016, when Senate of Somalia was established.

Establishment of Federal Parliament

Post-transition Roadmap
As part of the official "Roadmap for the End of Transition", a political process devised by former Prime Minister Abdiweli Mohamed Ali Gaas which provides clear benchmarks leading toward the establishment of permanent democratic institutions in Somalia by late August 2012, members of Somalia's then ruling Transitional Federal Government (TFG) and other administrative officials met in the northeastern town of Garowe in February 2012 to discuss post-transition arrangements. After extensive deliberations attended by regional actors and international observers, the conference ended in a signed agreement between TFG President Sharif Sheikh Ahmed, Prime Minister Abdiweli Gaas, Speaker of Parliament Sharif Hassan Sheikh Aden, Puntland President Abdirahman Mohamed Farole, Galmudug President Mohamed Ahmed Alim and Ahlu Sunna Waljama'a representative Khalif Abdulkadir Noor stipulating a new 225 member bicameral parliament would be formed, consisting of an upper house seating 54 senators and a lower house; of which 30% of the National Constituent Assembly (NCA) is earmarked for women; the President is to be appointed via a constitutional election; and the prime minister is selected by the president, who would then name a council of ministers.

On 23 June, TFG and regional leaders approved a draft constitution after several days of deliberation. The NCA, which consists of 30 elders drawn from each of the country's four major Somali clans (Darod, Dir, Hawiye, Rahanweyn) and 15 from a coalition of minority groups based on the 4.5 power-sharing formula, overwhelmingly passed the new constitution on 1 August. 96% of the 645 delegates present voted for it, 2% against it and 2% abstained. For the constitution to come into effect, it will need to be ratified by the new parliament.

Technical Selection Committee

On 18 August 2012, a list of 202 new parliamentarians was released, with a total of 215 legislators eventually sworn in on 20 August. A further 15 nominated lawmakers were approved by the Technical Selection Committee (TSC), an independent body officially tasked with vetting the applicants. However, verification of their paperwork was still pending before they could be officially sworn into parliament.

The remaining candidates that were submitted by the National Constituent Assembly's elders to the TSC were rejected for failing to meet specific criteria agreed upon by stakeholders that partook in earlier agreements, including the Galkayo and Garowe Principles accords. The minimal selection criteria required potential MPs to be Somali nationals possessing a "sound mind", to have at least a high school diploma, to be capable of carrying out parliamentary duties, and to have no reported links with warlords, rebels, armed groups and other potential spoiler elements. The TSC also based its screening procedure on detailed background information on the parliamentary candidates that was forwarded to it by the United Nations and African Union.

Inauguration
The inaugural session of parliament was held on 20 August 2012, at the Mogadishu airport since the main parliament building was undergoing renovations. The outgoing President, Prime Minister and Speaker of Parliament all attended the ceremony in the capital, which witnessed the swearing in of most of the MPs and the selection of a new interim Speaker.

10th Parliament (2016) 
The tenth Parliament of Somalia was inaugurated on 27 December 2016.

In a statement to the United Nations Security Council, Michael Keating, Special Representative and Head of the United Nations Assistance Mission in Somalia (UNSOM), noted that the Upper House of Parliament had come into existence, comprising 54 members chosen on the basis of the federal member state rather than on a clan basis; the electorate had expanded from 135 male elders in 2012, to more than 13,000, 30% of whom were women; and voting had taken place in six locations around the country, reflecting emerging state structures.

The constitutional mandate of the parliamentarians ended on 27 December 2020, and Somalia had no parliament until the swearing-in of the 11th Parliament in 2022.

11th Parliament (2022) 
Members of the 11th Federal Parliament of Somalia were sworn-in in Mogadishu on 14 April 2022. 250 out of 275 members of the House of the People and 40 out of 54 members of the Senate took their oaths of office.

Abdi Hashi Abdullahi was reelected as speaker of the Senate, and Ali Shacban Ibrahim and Abdullahi Ali Hirsi were elected as first and second deputy speakers on 26 April 2022. Sheikh Aden Mohamed Nur Madobe was elected as speaker of the House of the People on 27 April 2022, while Saadia Yasin Haji Samatar and Abdullahi Omar Abshirow were elected as first and second deputy speakers the next day.

Speaker of Parliament

On 20 August 2012, former Somali National Army (SNA) General Muse Hassan Sheikh Sayid Abdulle was appointed Interim Speaker and Acting President. Voting for a new Speaker of Parliament was held on 28 August 2012, with former Minister of Transportation and Minister of Labor and Sports Mohamed Osman Jawari elected as Speaker. Jaylaani Nur Ikar and Mahad Abdalle Awad are serving as his First Deputy Speaker and Second Deputy Speaker, respectively.

Duties
The Federal Parliament of Somalia constitutes the legislative branch of government, with the Federal Government of Somalia representing the executive division.

The parliament elects the President, Speaker of Parliament and Deputy Speakers. It also has the authority to pass and veto laws.

In addition, the national parliament is tasked with selecting the ultimate number and boundaries of the autonomous regional states (officially, Federal Member States) within the Federal Republic of Somalia.

On 2 April 2014, the parliamentary committee of interior and security announced that it would soon establish a committee to oversee the federalism process in Somalia's constituent provinces.

Composition

The Federal Parliament of Somalia is bicameral, consisting of an Upper House and a Lower House (House of the People). It includes many professionals and university graduates. At least 30% of seats are legally reserved for women, a quota secured by Somali parliamentary consultant Hodan Ahmed and women political leaders. Ahmed had also helped form the Somali Women Parliamentary Association in 2009 in the preceding Transitional Federal Parliament.

An official list of Members of the Federal Parliament was first published on 17 August 2012 by the Office of the Somali Parliament.

Senate

The Senate, or Upper house, was elected during Somali parliamentary election held on 2016 and it contains 54 senators.

House of the People
The House of the People, or lower house, is eventually expected to comprise 275 MPs.

Committees
The Federal Parliament has a number of committees, which are tasked with carrying out its duties. They include:

Oversight, Review and Implementation Committee
Rules of Procedure, Ethics, Discipline and Immunity Committee
Judiciary, Religious Sites and Religious Affairs Committee
Internal Affairs, Regional Administration and Security Committee
Truth, Reconciliation and Restitution Committee
Committee on Budget, Finance, Planning, International Cooperation and Financial Oversight of Public Institutions
Foreign Affairs Committee
Defence Committee
Human Rights, Women and Humanitarian Affairs Committee
Social Services Development Committee
National Resource Committee
Information & Media, Public Awareness, Culture Post and Telecommunication Committee
Committee for Roads, Ports, Airports, Energy and Transport
Committee for Economy, Trade and Industry

In March 2015, the Federal Cabinet agreed to establish a new commission tasked with overseeing the nationalization and integration of security forces in the country.

List of Parliaments
 1st Somali Parliament (1956–1959) – majority party :  Somali Youth League
 2nd Somali Parliament (1959–1964) – majority party : Somali Youth League
 3rd Somali Parliament (1964–1969) – majority party : Somali Youth League
 4th Somali Parliament (1969–1970) – majority party : Supreme Revolutionary Council
 5th Somali Parliament (1980–1986) – majority party : Supreme Revolutionary Council
 6th Somali Parliament (1986–1991) – majority party : Supreme Revolutionary Council
 7th Somali Parliament (2000–2003) – majority party : none
 8th Somali Parliament (2004–2012) – majority party : none
 9th Somali Parliament (2012–2016) – majority party : none
10th Somali Parliament (2016–2020) – majority party : none
 11th Somali Parliament (2022–2026) – majority party : none

Voting system
Article 47 of the Provisional Constitution stipulates that "the regulations concerning[...] elections at the Federal Government level[...] shall be defined in special laws enacted by the House of the People of the Federal Parliament of Somalia."

Tenure
According to the Office of the Somali Parliament, sitting legislators are mandated to serve from 2016 to 2020. The Parliamentary term elapsed on 27 December 2020, with the election date yet to be announced.

Memberships
The Federal Parliament of Somalia is a member of the Inter-Parliamentary Union (IPU), the international organization of parliaments.

See also

Cabinet of Somalia
Judiciary of Somalia
List of speakers of the Parliament of Somalia

Notes

External links
Federal Parliament of Somalia – Official website
Chiefs of State and Cabinet Members of Foreign Governments – Somalia
Inter-Parliamentary Union – Somalia (House of the People)

2012 establishments in Somalia
Somalia
Government of Somalia
Somalia
Somalia
Politics of Somalia
Political organisations based in Somalia